Schwarzhorn may refer to mountains/peaks in:

Austria
Tilisuna-Schwarzhorn (2460 m), in the Rätikon range, in Vorarlberg

Italy
Schwarzhorn/Corno Nero (Monte Rosa) (4321 m), part of the Monte Rosa massif, on southern side of the Pennine Alps, in Italy just next to Swiss border (Ludwigshöhe)
Schwarzhorn (South Tyrol)/Corno Nero (2439 m) in South Tyrol

Switzerland
Schwarzhorn (Bernese Alps) (2928 m), in the Bernese Alps between Brienz and Grindelwald (BE)
Schwarzhorn (Binntal)/Punta Marani (3108 m), on the border to Italy in canton of Valais (VS), between the Binntal (Valais) and the Valle Dèvero (Piedmont)
Schwarzhorn (Flüela) (3146 m), near Flüela Pass, Albula Alps (GR)
Piz Gren/Schwarzhorn (2890 m), part of the Lepontine Alps, above Obersaxen, Vorderrhein (GR)
Schwarzhorn (Mattertal) (3201 m), near St. Niklaus (VS), west of Embd
Parpaner Schwarzhorn (2683 m), in the Grisons (GR), between Arosa and Lenzerheide
Schwarzhorn (Rätikon) (2574 m), part of the Rätikon (GR), on the border to Liechtenstein
Schwarzhorn (Vals) (2944 m), part of Lepontine Alps, west of Vals (GR)
Schwarzhorn (Wildstrubel massif) (3105 m), in the Bernese Alps (BE), west of Leukerbad (VS)
Schwarzhorn (Pennine Alps) (2789 m), just in between Saint-Luc and Chandolin, near the Illhorn and Bella Tola in Switzerland Valais.
Schwarzberghorn/Corno Nero (3609 m), on southern side of the Pennine Alps, on the Swiss (VS) - Italian (Piedmont) border, the northern end of Weissgrat, meeting point of the Swiss Mattertal, Saastal, and the Italian Val Anzansca.